The 1949 Ohio Bobcats football team was an American football team that represented Ohio University in the Mid-American Conference (MAC) during the 1949 college football season. In their first season under head coach Carroll Widdoes, the Bobcats compiled a 4–4–1 record (2–2 against MAC opponents), finished in third place in the MAC, and were outscored by all opponents by a combined total of 120 to 114. Three Ohio players received All-MAC honors: offensive tackle Al Scheider (first team); offensive guard Milt Taylor (first team); and end John Marco (second team).  They played their home games in Peden Stadium in Athens, Ohio.

Schedule

References

Ohio
Ohio Bobcats football seasons
Ohio Bobcats football